Dwayne Anthony Missouri (born December 23, 1978) is a former American football defensive end in the National Football League (NFL) for the Baltimore Ravens, Dallas Cowboys, San Francisco 49ers. He also was a member of the Berlin Thunder in the NFL Europe League (NFLEL) Colorado Crush and the Philadelphia Soul, Utah Blaze in the Arena Football League. He played college football at Northwestern University.

Early years
Missouri attended Theodore Roosevelt High School. As a senior, he helped his team win the state championship in football, receiving All-state, All-district, All-city and Defensive Player of the year honors. 

He also practiced track, where he was a two-time Academic All-district selection as a shot putter.

College career
Missouri accepted a football scholarship from Northwestern University. As a true freshman, he suffered a fractured fifth metatarsal in his right foot, that forced him to redshirt.

As a redshirt freshman, he appeared in 7 games, making 4 tackles and one fumble recovery. As a sophomore, he was named a starter at left defensive end, posting 34 tackles, 7 tackles for loss and 3 sacks.

As a junior, he recorded 52 tackles, 20 tackles for loss and 5 sacks. As a senior, he registered 51 tackles, 16 tackles for loss, 9 sacks and 5 forced fumbles (led the conference).

Professional career

Baltimore Ravens
Missouri was selected by the Baltimore Ravens in the seventh round (231st overall) of the 2001 NFL Draft. He was declared inactive for the season opener against the Chicago Bears. On September 12, he was waived to make room for linebacker Shannon Taylor, and was signed to the practice squad the next day.

Dallas Cowboys
On October 29, 2001, he was signed by the Dallas Cowboys from the Ravens practice squad. He was deactivated for the seventh and eighth game. He was a backup at left defensive end against the Philadelphia Eagles. He was deactivated for games tenth to thirteenth. He saw action against the Arizona Cardinals, before being deactivated for the last 2 games. 

In 2002, he was allocated to the Berlin Thunder of the NFL Europe League (NFLEL). He collected 27 tackles, 5.5 sacks (second in the league), 4 passes defensed and 3 forced fumbles, helping the team win World Bowl X. He was released from the Cowboys on August 19.

San Francisco 49ers
On March 31, 2003, he was signed as a free agent by the San Francisco 49ers. On May 19, it was reported in the media that he didn't show up for a minicamp. The next day, it was reported that Missouri was quitting football.

Colorado Crush (AFL)
In 2003, he was signed by the Colorado Crush of the Arena Football League. He played in 7 games, making 8.5 total tackles, one sack, and 3 passes defensed. On September 17, he was traded to the Philadelphia Soul in exchange for a first round draft choice in the 2004 Expansion Draft.

Philadelphia Soul (AFL)
In his 4 seasons with the Philadelphia Soul of the Arena Football League, he registered 72.5 total tackles (10.5 for loss), 18.5 sacks, 15 passes defensed, 15 forced fumbles, 2 blocked kicks, 6 receptions for 38 yards and 2 touchdowns. He was released on November 12, 2007.

Utah Blaze (AFL)
On November 20, 2007, he was signed by the Utah Blaze of the Arena Football League.

Personal life
Missouri was featured in the first season of HBO's Hard Knocks series as a member of the Baltimore Ravens. He is currently an assistant high school football coach at McCollum High School in San Antonio, Texas and working on his alternative certification to become a special education teacher.

References

1978 births
Living people
Players of American football from San Antonio
German players of American football
American football defensive tackles
American football defensive ends
Northwestern Wildcats football players
Baltimore Ravens players
Dallas Cowboys players
Berlin Thunder players
San Francisco 49ers players
Colorado Crush players
Philadelphia Soul players
Utah Blaze players
High school football coaches in Texas
Sportspeople from Frankfurt